A tractor is a vehicle designed for hauling in agriculture or construction. 

Tractor may also refer to:

Music
 Tractor (band), an English rock band
 The Tractors, an American country music band
 The Tractors (album), the band's debut album
"Tractor", a song by Monster Magnet from Powertrip

Other uses
 Tractor beam, a science fiction device
 Tractor (card game), a family of point trick-taking games played in China and in Chinese immigrant communities
 Tractor, a magnetic tape system peripheral for the IBM 7950 Harvest supercomputer
 "Tractor", nickname of Robert Traylor (1977-2011), American basketball player
 Tractor Brewing Company, New Mexico
 Tractor S.C., an Iranian football club 
 Tractor Supply Company, an American retail chain of stores
 A nickname for the British Rail Class 37 locomotive

See also
 Bernardo Provenzano (1933-2016), member of the Sicilian Mafia nicknamed Binnu u tratturi (Sicilian for "Binnie the tractor")
 Little Red Tractor, a British children's television series
 Tractor configuration, where the propeller of an airplane faces forward and pulls the aircraft forward
 Tractor Tom, a British computer-animated children's TV programme
 Traktor, DJ software
 Traktor Chelyabinsk, a professional ice hockey team based in Chelyabinsk, Russia.